Electrophoresis is the motion of dispersed particles relative to a fluid under the influence of a spatially uniform electric field.

"Electrophoresis" can also refer to:

Interface and colloid science
Dielectrophoresis, similar motion in a space non-uniform electric field
Microelectrophoresis, a method of studying electrophoresis of various dispersed particles using optical microscopy
Electrophoretic light scattering, a method for measuring electrophoretic mobility based on dynamic light scattering

Molecular biology and biochemistry 
Affinity electrophoresis, used to separate and characterize biomolecules on basis of their molecular characteristics through binding to another biomolecule
Capillary electrophoresis, commonly used to separate biomolecules by their charge and frictional forces
Gel electrophoresis, a technique used by scientists to separate molecules based on physical characteristics such as size, shape, or isoelectric point
electrophoresis of nucleic acids, a specific type of gel electrophoresis used to analyse DNA and RNA
electrophoresis of proteins, a specific type of gel electrophoresis used to analyse proteins
two-dimensional electrophoresis, a specific type of gel electrophoresis commonly used to analyse proteins which involves two separation mechanisms to separate molecules
SDS-PAGE, sodium dodecyl sulfate polyacrylamide gel electrophoresis, commonly used to analyse proteins
Immunoelectrophoresis, used to separate and characterize biomolecules on basis their molecular characteristics as well as binding of antibodies

Medicine 
Iontophoresis, a way of rapidly administering drugs through the skin

Media support 
Electrophoretic display, a device that displays media contents using charged pigment particles in an applied electric field

Other
Electrophoresis (journal)
__notoc__

Colloidal chemistry
Electrophoresis
Laboratory techniques